Rodigan may refer to:
David Rodigan
Knights of Rodigan